"Tausend Sterne" is a song written and recorded by the Belgian acid house musician Praga Khan on the album Freakazoids.

Track listing
 "Tausend Sterne" – 3:30	
 "Freakazoidz" – 2:56

References

2003 singles
Praga Khan songs
2003 songs
EMI Records singles